Maxfield is a town in Penobscot County, Maine, United States.  The population was 89 at the 2020 census.

Geography
Maxfield sits along the Piscataquis River.

History
Maxfield was incorporated in 1824 from a portion of the Bridgton Academy Grant.

In the early 1890s Maxfield was within the range of a giant (400 pound) wild black bear named "Old Ranger" who was eventually shot and killed by a local hunting party after a lifetime of raiding orchards, and having survived numerous other attempts to do him in. According to a New York Sun obituary of Old Ranger, "the whole of Penobscot County knew the bear, and he defied the entire population."

Demographics

2010 census
As of the census of 2010, there were 97 people, 41 households, and 26 families living in the town. The racial makeup of the town was 91.8% White, 4.1% Native American, 1.0% Pacific Islander, and 3.1% from two or more races. Hispanic or Latino of any race were 1.0% of the population.

There were 41 households, of which 22.0% had children under the age of 18 living with them, 43.9% were married couples living together, 12.2% had a female householder with no husband present, 7.3% had a male householder with no wife present, and 36.6% were non-families. 29.3% of all households were made up of individuals, and 12.2% had someone living alone who was 65 years of age or older. The average household size was 2.37 and the average family size was 2.77.

The median age in the town was 40.5 years. 20.6% of residents were under the age of 18; 7.3% were between the ages of 18 and 24; 27.8% were from 25 to 44; 26.8% were from 45 to 64; and 17.5% were 65 years of age or older. The gender makeup of the town was 50.5% male and 49.5% female.

2000 census
As of the census of 2000, there were 87 people, 39 households, and 23 families living in the town. The population density was 4.6 people per square mile (1.8/km2). There were 52 housing units at an average density of 2.7/sq mi (1.1/km2). The racial makeup of the town was 100.00% White.

There were 39 households, out of which 25.6% had children under the age of 18 living with them, 51.3% were married couples living together, 10.3% had a female householder with no husband present, and 38.5% were non-families. 25.6% of all households were made up of individuals, and 5.1% had someone living alone who was 65 years of age or older. The average household size was 2.23 and the average family size was 2.71.

In the town, the population was spread out, with 21.8% under the age of 18, 3.4% from 18 to 24, 28.7% from 25 to 44, 33.3% from 45 to 64, and 12.6% who were 65 years of age or older. The median age was 44 years. For every 100 females, there were 97.7 males. For every 100 females age 18 and over, there were 94.3 males.

See also
  School Administrative Unit 31

References

Towns in Penobscot County, Maine
Towns in Maine